Checking Out is a 1976 Broadway play written by Allen Swift. It opened on September 14, 1976, at the Longacre Theatre and closed on September 25, 1976, after 16 performances.

Original production
The show was directed by Jerry Adler, scenery David Jenkins, lighting Ken Billington, costumes Carol Luiken, production stage manager Murray Gitlin, and press by Susan Bloch.

The opening night cast starred Joan Copeland (Florence Grayson), Hy Anzell (Bernard Applebaum), Allen Swift (Morris Applebaum), Jonathan Moore (Mr. Johnson), Mason Adams (Dr. Theodore Applebaum), Larry Bryggman (Dr. Sheldon Henning), Tazewell Thompson (Gilbert), and Michael Gorrin (Schmuel Axelrod).

Setting
Morris Applebaum's apartment on West 57th Street.

Act I 
Scene 1 — An April morning
Scene 2 — 530 am the next day
Scene 3 — Four hours later
Act II — A few days later, morning

Plot
An aging Yiddish stage actor decides to schedule and stage-manage his own death.

References

1976 plays
Broadway plays
Plays set in New York City